Brady is a surname derived from the Irish surname Ó Brádaigh or Mac Brádaigh, meaning "spirited; broad".

In a listing by the U.S. Census Bureau of the Most Common U.S. Surnames, Brady was ranked at #411 in 2014.

The surname was used as a test of nominative determinism in a humorous 2013 article in the British Medical Journal.

Surname

A
Aidan Brady (1930–1993), Irish Gaelic footballer
Áine Brady (born 1954), Irish politician
Al Brady (1910–1937), American criminal
Alan Brady (1909–1969), Australian rugby union footballer
Alec Brady (1870–1913), Scottish footballer
Alfred Barton Brady (1856–1932), Australian architect
Alice Brady (1892–1939), American silent-film actress
Alice Brady (labour activist) (1898–1914), Irish labour activist
Alison Brady (born 1979), American photographer
Andrea Brady (born 1974), American poet
Angela Brady, Irish architect
Anne-Marie Brady (born 1966), New Zealand political researcher
Anthony Brady (disambiguation), multiple people
Antonio Brady (1811–1881), English naturalist
Arthur Brady (disambiguation), multiple people
Austin Brady (born 1955), Irish footballer

B
Beau Brady (born 1981), Australian actor
Bernie Brady (born 1947), Australian rules footballer
Bill Brady (disambiguation), multiple people
Bob Brady (disambiguation), multiple people
Bobbi Ann Brady, Canadian politician
Brendan Brady (footballer) (1917–2010), Australian rules footballer
Brian Brady (1903–1949), Irish politician
Brian Brady (baseball) (born 1962), American baseball player
Brookner Brady (1905–1977), American pentathlete and colonel

C
Campbell Brady (1891–1947), Australian rules footballer
Carolyn Brady (1937–2005), American artist
Catherine Brady, American writer
Cathy Brady ( 2023), Irish film director and screenwriter
Charles Brady (disambiguation), multiple people
Christopher Brady (disambiguation), multiple people
Christian M. M. Brady (born 1969), American translator
Christine Brady, American philanthropist
Ciarán Brady (born 1994), Irish Gaelic footballer
Claire Brady (disambiguation), multiple people
Cliff Brady (1897–1974), American baseball player
Clifton Brady (1894–1963), American architect
Colin Brady, American animator
Conor Brady, Irish journalist
Conor Brady (Gaelic footballer) (born 1998), Irish Gaelic footballer
Cyprian Brady (born 1962), Irish politician

D
Dan Brady (disambiguation), multiple people
Darren Brady (born 1981), Scottish footballer
Dave Brady (fl. 1930–1988), American sportswriter
David Brady (born 1974), Irish Gaelic footballer
David W. Brady, American political scientist
Denis Caulfield Brady (1804–1886), British politician 
Dennis Brady (born 1951), New Zealand cricketer
Dennis Pat Brady (1928–2010), American boxer
Donita Brady, American biologist
Donny Brady (born 1973), American football player
Dorothy Brady (1903–1977), American mathematician and economist
Doug Brady (born 1969), American baseball player
Dylan Brady (born 1993), American singer-songwriter
Dylan Brady (country singer) (born 1998), American singer-songwriter

E
E. J. Brady (1869–1952), Australian journalist and writer
Edward Brady (disambiguation), multiple people
Edwin James Brady (1869–1952), Australian poet
Elizabeth Brady (1803–1874), British headmistress
Elward Thomas Brady Jr. (1926–2007), American politician
Emily Brady, English philosopher
Erin Brady (born 1987), American television host
Erin Brady (politician), American politician
Ernest Brady (1917–2003), English academic administrator
Eugene R. Brady (1928–2011), American naval aviator

F
Farmer Brady (1893–??), American baseball player
Fern Brady (born 1986), Scottish comedian
Francis Brady (disambiguation), multiple people
Frank Brady (disambiguation), multiple people

G
Garry Brady (born 1976), Scottish footballer
Gavin Brady (born 1973), New Zealand sailor
Genevieve Garvan Brady (1880–1938), American philanthropist
George Brady (disambiguation), multiple people
Ger Brady, Gaelic footballer
Gerald Brady (born 1956), American politician
Gerard Brady (1936–2020), Irish politician
Gerry Brady (born 1948), Irish politician
Gerry Brady (sport shooter) (1925–2012), Irish sport shooter
Glenn Brady (1935–2019), American football and baseball coach
Gordon L. Brady, American economist
Graham Brady (born 1967), British politician
Greg Brady (disambiguation), multiple people

H
Hana Brady (1931–1944), Czechoslovakian-Jewish holocaust victim
Henry Brady (disambiguation), multiple people
Holly A. Brady (born 1969), American judge
Hugh Brady (disambiguation), multiple people

I
Ian Brady (1938–2017), Scottish serial killer

J
Jack Brady (born 1996), Irish footballer
Jackie Brady (born 1975), British artistic gymnast
Jackson Brady (born 1997), New Zealand footballer
Jasper Ewing Brady (1797–1871), American politician
James Brady (disambiguation), multiple people
Jeff Brady (born 1968), American football player
Jeff Brady (reporter), American reporter
Jennifer Brady (born 1995), American tennis player
Jerry Brady (born 1936), American businessman
Jim Brady (disambiguation), multiple people
Joan Brady (disambiguation), multiple people
John Brady (disambiguation), multiple people
Joseph Brady (disambiguation), multiple people
Julio Brady (1942–2015), U.S. Virgin Islander judge
Justin Brady, British actor

K
Karen Brady (born 1986), Irish camogie player
Kathleen Brady (disambiguation), multiple people
Karren Brady (born 1969), British sporting executive and broadcaster
Kerry Brady (born 1963), American football player
Kevin Brady (disambiguation), multiple people
Kieron Brady (born 1971), Scottish footballer
Killian Brady (born 1990), Irish Gaelic footballer
King Brady (1881–1947), American baseball player
Kyle Brady (born 1972), American football player

L
Laurence Brady (1892–1973), Irish politician
Laurie Brady (1895–1944), Australian rules footballer
Leo Brady (1917–1984), American writer
Liam Brady (born 1956), Irish footballer

M
Marcus Brady (born 1979), American football coach
Margaret Brady (disambiguation), multiple people
Mathew Brady (1823–1896), Irish-American photographer
Matt Brady (born 1965), American basketball coach
Matthew Brady (disambiguation), multiple people
Maureen Brady (born 1943), American writer
Maurice V. Brady (1904–1991), American politician
Mary Brady (1821–1864), American nurse
Maya Brady, American softball player
Maziere Brady (1796–1871), Irish judge
Michael Brady (disambiguation), multiple people
Mickey Brady (born 1950), Irish politician
Mildred Edie Brady (1906–1965), American writer
Millie Brady (born 1993), British actress
M. Jane Brady (born 1951), American attorney and judge
Moya Brady (born 1962), English actress

N
Neal Brady (1897–1947), American baseball player
Neil Brady (born 1968), Canadian ice hockey player
Nicholas Brady (disambiguation), multiple people
Nigel Brady (born 1979), Irish rugby union footballer

O
Ollie Brady, Irish Gaelic footballer
Orla Brady (born 1961), Irish film and television actress

P
Pam Brady, American television producer
Pam Bristol Brady (born 1953), American badminton player
Pat Brady (disambiguation), multiple people
Patrick Brady (disambiguation), multiple people
Paul Brady (disambiguation), multiple people
Peta Brady (born 1972), Australian actress
Peter Brady (disambiguation), multiple people
Philip Brady (disambiguation), multiple people

R
Ray Brady (1937–2016), Irish footballer
Rhonda Brady (born 1959), American track and field athlete
Richard Brady (??–1607), Irish prelate
Rickey Brady (born 1970), American football player
Robert Brady (disambiguation), multiple people
Rodney H. Brady (1933–2017), American businessman
Roger A. Brady (born 1946), American general
Rory Brady (1957–2010), Irish barrister
Roscoe Brady (1923–2016), American biochemist
Royston Brady (born 1972), Irish businessman and politician

S
Samuel Brady (1756–1795), American military captain
Samuel Brady (Maryland politician) (??–1871), American politician
Sarah Brady (1942–2015), American activist
Scott Brady (1924–1985), American actor
Scott Brady (lawyer), American attorney
Seán Brady (disambiguation), multiple people
Shannon Brady (born 1996), Australian footballer
Shaun Brady, British trade unionist
Shawn Brady (2014-??), Municipal Judge Denmark WI
Spike Brady (1854–??), American baseball player
St. Elmo Brady (1884–1966), American chemist
Stephen Brady (disambiguation), multiple people
Stumpy Brady (1910–??), American musician
Susan Brady (disambiguation), multiple people

T
Terence Brady (disambiguation), multiple people
Terry Brady, Irish businessman and sports owner
Terry Brady (footballer) (born 1944), Australian rules footballer
Tess Brady (born 1948), American writer
Thérèse Brady (1930–1999), Irish psychologist
Thomas Brady (disambiguation), multiple people
Tiernan Brady, Irish-Australian politician
Tom Brady (born 1977), American football player

V
Vanessa Brady (born 1959), English interior designer
Veronica Brady (1929–2015), Australian religious figure
Vincent Brady (1936–2020), Irish politician

W
Wayne Brady (born 1972), American comedian and TV personality
William Brady (disambiguation), multiple people
W. Tate Brady (1870–1925), American businessman

Fictional characters
Bo Brady, character in Days of Our Lives
Brendan Brady, character in Hollyoaks
Caroline Brady, character in Days of Our Lives
Carrie Brady, character in Days of Our Lives
Cassie Brady, character in Days of Our Lives
Charles Brady, character in Sleepwalkers (1992 film)
Chelsea Brady, character in Days of Our Lives
Cheryl Brady, character in Days of Our Lives
Ciara Brady, character in Days of Our Lives
Eric Brady, character in Days of Our Lives
Frankie Brady, character in Days of Our Lives
Hope Williams Brady, character in Days of Our Lives
Kayla Brady, character in Days of Our Lives
Kimberly Brady, character in Days of Our Lives
Roman Brady, character in Days of Our Lives
Sami Brady, character in Days of Our Lives
Shawn Brady, character in Days of Our Lives
Shawn-Douglas Brady, character in Days of Our Lives

See also 
Brady (disambiguation), a disambiguation page
Brady (given name), people with the given name of Brady
Attorney General Brady (disambiguation), a disambiguation page for Attorney Generals surnamed Brady
General Brady (disambiguation), a disambiguation page for Generals surnamed Brady
Justice Brady (disambiguation), a disambiguation page for Justices surnamed Brady
Senator Brady (disambiguation), a disambiguation page for Senators surnamed Brady

Notes 

English-language surnames
Anglicised Irish-language surnames